The Battle of Pločnik was fought sometime between 1385 and 1387 near the village of Pločnik (near Prokuplje in today's southeastern Serbia), between the forces of Serbian Prince Lazar Hrebeljanović, and the invading Ottoman Army of Sultan Murad I.

Background
The Ottoman army penetrated Pomoravlje and neighbouring areas, killing and looting, then clashed with the subjects of Lazar at Dubravnica (1381), where they were successfully fought off. With a larger force, the Ottoman Sultan Murad I attacked Serbia in 1386, when according to some sources Niš was conquered.

Murad I had campaigned against the Karamanids and defeated their army near Konya. Serbian soldiers from some vassal Serbian lords had accompanied the Ottoman army. Some of the soldiers (including some Serbian soldiers) were executed because of looting civilian property, disobeying the Sultan's order. Many of the vassal Serbian lords now began to support Lazar against the Ottomans. At that time, one lord in Shkodër wrote a letter to the Sultan and promised to recognise Ottoman sovereignty and aid the Ottoman army if Ottoman troops were to be sent to protect him. Murad I thus ordered an akinji commander, Kula Şahin Bey, to prepare his troops (according to Namık Kemal, this was not Lala Şahin Paşa, as is commonly believed).

Battle
The Serbian army emerged victorious, although details of the actual battle are scarce. Şahin Bey entered Serbia with 20,000 akinjis at that time he learned that Serbian lords had prepared an army to attack his troops. He advanced to Pločnik near Prokuplje but could not detect the position of that army, and believed that there was none. At that time, many akinjis (about 18,000) lost their temper and began looting civilian properties in the surrounding villages by disobeying orders. Şahin Bey stayed alone with 2,000 soldiers. On the other hand, the battlefield was observed by Serbian expeditionary forces.

Suddenly an allied army with 15,000 soldiers appeared, many of whom were cavalry. The Serbian army used heavy knight cavalry charge with horse archers on the flanks. The Serbs first attacked the Ottoman center (2,000 soldiers). Although unprepared, suffering a shock to heavy Serbian knights, the outnumbered Ottoman center resisted for some time but later began to withdraw with Şahin Bey who barely escaped with his life.

Then the Serbian army turned to the other 18,000 akinjis that were busy plundering; unprepared, ill-disciplined, surprised akinjis couldn't do anything without their general. Only 5,000 of them returned home alive. More than 60% of the Ottoman army was destroyed. According to tradition Serbian knight and folk hero Miloš Obilić participated in this battle and distinguished himself, and was wounded by an Ottoman arrow.

According to some, such as historian Vjekoslav Klaić, Lazar's army was aided by Bosnian troops. One version of the battle has it that the battle was won thanks to the Bosnian troops and the trickery of a Kastrioti.

Aftermath
The victory gave prestige to the Serbs. It was the first serious defeat of the Ottomans in the Balkans. The Ottoman army next campaigned in Bosnia, fighting Bosnian troops led by Vlatko Vuković and Radič Sanković at Bileća (1388), ending in a decisive Bosnian victory, then in Kosovo, fighting Serbian troops at the Kosovo field (1389), ending inconclusively. Murad had decided to make one more powerful thrust, aimed at the heart of the now seemingly revitalised Serbian Empire, with a campaign in 1389 which culminated in a Battle of Kosovo.

See also 
 History of the Serbian-Turkish wars

Annotations

References

Sources

1385 in Europe
1386 in Europe
1387 in Europe
Battles involving the Ottoman Empire
Battles involving Serbia
Conflicts in 1385
Conflicts in 1386
Conflicts in 1387
14th century in Serbia
1385 in the Ottoman Empire
1386 in the Ottoman Empire
1387 in the Ottoman Empire
Battles involving the Bosnian people
Battles involving the Kingdom of Bosnia